Ryūsei (written: 竜青, 竜星, 隆聖, 隆成, 流星 or 劉生) is a masculine Japanese given name. Notable people with the name include:

, Japanese actor 
, Japanese kickboxer

Ryusei Furukawa (1893–1968), Japanese painter
, Japanese baseball player
, Japanese painter
, Japanese kickboxer 
, Japanese football player
, Japanese actor
, Japanese sumo wrestler
, Japanese footballer
, Japanese baseball player
, Japanese handball player
, Yoshinkan aikido master
, Japanese footballer
, Japanese basketball player
, Japanese footballer 
, Japanese baseball player
, Japanese motorcycle racer

See also
 Ryūsei (disambiguation)

Japanese masculine given names